Edgar Taylor may refer to:

 Edgar Taylor (author) (1793–1839), British writer of legal, historical, and literary works
 Edgar Taylor (aviator) (1897–1918), American flying ace of World War I
 Edgar Taylor (horticulturist) (1886–1979), New Zealand landscape architect 
 Edgar Kendall Taylor (1905–1999), British pianist

See also
 Taylor Edgar (born 1987), stand-up comic and musician